KJXN (105.1 FM) is a radio station licensed to South Park, Wyoming, United States. The station is currently owned by Cochise Media Licenses, LLC.

History
The station was assigned the call letters KTYN on April 21, 2005. On April 4, 2008, the station changed its call sign to KRFD. On April 17, 2009, the call sign was changed to KJXN.

References

External links

JXN
Mainstream adult contemporary radio stations in the United States
Teton County, Wyoming
Radio stations established in 2005
2005 establishments in Wyoming